Bear Shooters is a 1930 Our Gang short comedy film directed by Robert F. McGowan. It was the 98th (tenth talking) Our Gang short that was released.

Plot
Spud wants to go camping and shoot many bears with Jackie, Chubby, and Farina. But his mother has forced him to look after his little brother Wheezer, who has the croup.
In caring for his brother he must periodically apply ointment to his chest. He tells his friends he must stay home and grease Wheezer. He tries to get his sister Mary Ann to do this but she insists on going camping. Spud decides to merely go camping anyway and take both Wheezer and Mary Ann along. The gang all go together in an old dilapidated wagon guided by Dinah The Mule. The trip initially goes smoothly, but after some time two bootleggers who have themselves concealed in the area spot the gang and decide to try to get the gang to leave. One of the bootleggers dresses up in a gorilla suit in order to scare the gang away. While he scares the gang, the gang manages to trap the ape. Eventually the gang ends up leaving the forest due to a skunk spraying the area, not the bootlegger in the ape suit.

Production notes
Bear Shooters is a remake of the 1924 silent entry It's a Bear. Allen Hoskins appeared in both films.

Bear Shooters is one of four sound Our Gang shorts that fell into the public domain after the copyright lapsed in the 1960s (the other three being School's Out, Our Gang Follies of 1938 and Waldo's Last Stand). As such, these films frequently appear on inexpensive video and/or DVD compilations.

Cast

The Gang
 Norman Chaney as Chubby
 Jackie Cooper as Jackie
 Allen Hoskins as Farina
 Bobby Hutchins as Wheezer
 Mary Ann Jackson as Mary Ann
 Leon Janney as Donald 'Spud'
 Pete the Pup as himself
 Dinah the Mule as herself

Additional cast
 Fay Holderness as Spud's mother
 Charlie Hall as Charlie (Bootlegger #2)
 Bob Kortman as Bob (Bootlegger #1)
 Charles Gemora as Charlie (in gorilla suit)

See also
Our Gang filmography

References

External links

 
 
 

1930 films
American black-and-white films
Films directed by Robert F. McGowan
Hal Roach Studios short films
1930 comedy films
Our Gang films
Articles containing video clips
1930 short films
1930s American films